"Le parole lontane" is a rock ballad song by Italian group Måneskin. It was included in their debut album Il ballo della vita and released as a single on 13 September 2019 by Sony Music.

Music video
The music video for "Le parole lontane", directed by Giacomo Triglia, premiered on 13 September 2019 via Måneskin's official YouTube channel.

Charts

Certifications

References

2010s ballads
2018 songs
2019 singles
Italian-language songs
Måneskin songs
Sony Music singles
Rock ballads
Songs written by Damiano David
Songs written by Victoria De Angelis